Zieria exsul is a plant in the citrus family Rutaceae and is endemic to a small area of southeast Queensland. It is an open, straggly shrub with hairy branches, three-part leaves and white flowers in groups of up to twelve, the groups longer than the leaves and each flower with four petals and four stamens.

Description
The upper surface of the leaf is slightly hairy but the lower surface is densely hairy with woolly, star-shaped hairs.

This species is similar to Zieria compacta except that it is a more straggly shrub and has glabrous flower stalks.

Taxonomy and naming
Zieria exsul was first formally described in 2007 by Marco Duretto and Paul Forster from a specimen collected in Caloundra  and the description was published in Austrobaileya. The specific epithet (exsul) is a Latin word meaning "a banished person" referring to this species having been displaced from most of its probable former range.

Distribution and habitat
This zieria grows in woodland and wallum heathland near Buderim and Caloundra in the South East Queensland biogeographic region.

Conservation
Zieria exsul is listed as "endangered" under the Queensland Nature Conservation Act 1992.

References

exsul
Sapindales of Australia
Flora of Queensland
Taxa named by Marco Duretto
Plants described in 2007
Taxa named by Paul Irwin Forster